The Rockville Centre station is a station along the Babylon Branch of the Long Island Rail Road. It is officially at North Village Avenue and Front Street north of Sunrise Highway in Rockville Centre, New York, but the station property spreads west to North Center Avenue and east to North Park Avenue. Parking is available throughout the Village of Rockville Centre, near the station for those with residential and non-residential permits. The station is east of the former Rockville Centre Bus Depot.

History

Early history 

Rockville Centre station was originally built by the South Side Railroad of Long Island on October 28, 1867 and remodeled in July 1881. The station was rebuilt on October 14, 1901, as the original station was moved to a private location that year and razed in 2004.

Grade crossing elimination project 
The second station was razed in March 1949 as part of a grade elevation project that would dominate the Babylon Branch throughout the post-WWII era. A temporary station was built southeast of the former location between April 19 and April 22, 1949.

Rockville Centre station was the site of a major railroad accident on February 17, 1950 that resulted in the deaths of 32 people, and serious injury of over 100 people. This occurred nine months before a similar accident in Kew Gardens, Queens that killed 79 people, and injured hundreds more. The current elevated structure was opened on July 17–18, 1950, and renovated toward the end of the 20th Century.

Station renovation 
The concrete platform at the station would be completely replaced. The project was to be done in multiple phases, and was scheduled to be completed in October 1983. As part of the project, the bathrooms and waiting room at the station were repainted, the stairway to the west of the lower level waiting room was replaced, and a new stairway would be built at the far western end of the platform. In addition, an elevator was to be constructed at the station. In August 1983, the LIRR awarded the contract to construct the new stairway. A dedication ceremony for the project took place on January 25, 1984. At that time, the elevator was slated to be completed in spring 1984.

In March 1985, the contract for the new stairway was cancelled since the manufacturer did not provide any design drawings. The contract was rebid and was awarded again in August 1985, with an estimated cost of $30,000. At the same time, the only existing staircase at the western end of the station had been removed, and would not be replaced until October 1985. Since the LIRR was unable to reduce the six-to-seven-month time period needed to fabricated the stairs, it was not able to get them installed by November 1985, and set a new completion date of February 1, 1986. In January 1986, work began on the installation of the new western stairway, but stopped after two days as the LIRR said the manufacturer made measurement mistakes. Work resumed later that month, and was expected to be completed by the end of the month.

Station layout 
The station has one 12-car-long high-level island platform between the two tracks.

In popular culture 
Though some scenes from the 2004 movie Eternal Sunshine of the Spotless Mind took place at Rockville Centre station, they were actually shot at Mount Vernon East station on the Metro-North Railroad New Haven Line.

References

External links 

 ROCKY Interlocking (The LIRR Today)
Rockville Centre Station Photo; March 11, 2007 (Unofficial LIRR History Website)
Rockville Centre Grade Project (TrainsAreFun.com)
 Village Avenue entrance from Google Maps Street View
 Station House from Google Maps Street View
 Park Avenue entrance from Google Maps Street View

Long Island Rail Road stations in Nassau County, New York
Railway stations in the United States opened in 1867
LIRR station
1867 establishments in New York (state)